Andreas Kübler (born 1963) is a former West German-German slalom canoeist who competed from the mid-1980s to the early 1990s. He won a silver medal in the C1 team event at the 1985 ICF Canoe Slalom World Championships in Augsburg.

World Cup individual podiums

References

German male canoeists
Living people
1963 births
Place of birth missing (living people)
Medalists at the ICF Canoe Slalom World Championships